The Department of Agriculture and Farmers' Welfare (DA&FW) is one of the three constituent department of Ministry of Agriculture and Farmers' Welfare, the other two being Department of Agriculture Research and Education (DARE) and Department of Animal Husbandry and Dairying. The Department is headed by Minister of Agriculture and Farmers' Welfare.

History
The Agriculture sector is vital for the Indian economy. As per the data of the 2011 Census, 54.6% of India's population was engaged in agriculture and it contributed 17.4% to India's Gross Value Added. The importance of the agriculture sector has led the Government of India to launch numerous initiatives. The Department  was thus established for sustainable development of  the agriculture sector. The DAC&FW is divided into 27 units and has five attached offices and 21 subordinate offices. The pre-independence India had attached Department of Agriculture, Revenue and Commerce set up in 1871. In 1881 the Department of Revenue and Agriculture was separated from it, further in 1923 the Department of Education and Health were combined in it to form Department of Education, Health and Land. In 1945 three separate department were made out of this, which were Department of Education, Health and Agriculture, respectively. In 1947, the Department of Agriculture was rededicated to the Ministry of Agriculture.

The present nomenclature of Ministry of Agriculture and Farmers' Welfare and Department of Agriculture and Farmers' Welfare is attributed to the two agencies vide cabinet resolution of 2015.

Initiatives

Rashtriya Krishi Vikas Yojana
The Rashtriya Krishi Vikas Yojana (National Agriculture Development Programme) was launched in 2007 and has been implemented across two Five Year Plan periods, namely the 11th and 12th Five Year Plans. The scheme incents the states to invest in the agriculture sector for holistic development of Agriculture and allied sector. In 2017, the Ministry of Agriculture extended the programme for three years up to 2019-20  which was to run as the centrally sponsored scheme of Rashtriya Krishi Vikas Yojana - Remunerative Approaches for Agriculture and Allied Sector Rejuvenation (RKVY-RAFTAAR). The centre and state's share in the funding is 60:40 for the General category states while for North-East and hilly areas it is 90:10. In case of Union Territory 100% funding is made by central government.

In 2020, under the Innovation and Agri-Entrepreneurship development component of the revamped Rashtriya Krishi Vikas Yojana, the Government of India funded various agricultural startups.

Pradhanmantri Fasal Bima Yojna

Launched in 2016, this scheme replaces erstwhile National Agriculture Insurance Scheme and Modified National Agriculture Insurance Scheme. It aims to reduce the burden of premium on farmers who take loans for their agricultural operations. The farmers are required to pay 2% premium for all Kharif crops and 1.5% and 5%, respectively, for Rabi and annual horticultural crops. The scheme is enforced under overall coordination of DA&FW and the state governments. The government will pay a balanced premium and there is no upper limit on the government subsidies. Further, the use of cutting-edge technology like GPS is mandated for recording crop-cutting experiment. The insurance plans will be handled under a single company, namely the Agriculture Insurance company of India.

Pradhanmantri Kisan Maan Dhan Yojna
The Pradhanmantri Kisan Maan Dhan Yojna is a pension scheme with Life Insurance Corporation of India as the pension fund manager. The beneficiary farmers will have to pay a monthly premium ranging from Rs.55 to Rs.200, depending upon their age of entry into the scheme and after reaching the age of 60 years they will be paid a monthly pension of Rs. 3000. The spouse is also eligible for pension after making a separate contribution under the scheme. Further, if the farmer dies after the retirement  age then the spouse will receive 50% of the pension as family pension. If the farmer dies before completing the retirement age, the spouse is eligible to continue in the scheme after paying the remaining contribution till the retirement age of the deceased farmer. If the spouse does not wish to continue then the total corpus along with the interest will be paid to the spouse. If there is no spouse, the total contribution along with the premium shall be paid to the nominee. In case of death of both farmer and his spouse, the contribution made will be credited back to the pension fund.

Prime Minister Kisan Samman Nidhi Scheme

The Prime Minister Kisan Samman Nidhi Scheme or PM Kisan is a type of basic income scheme under which all farmers (subject to some exclusion criteria) are provided an annual income of Rs. 6000 in three installments of Rs. 2000 each, directly into their bank account. Initially, farmers with less than 2 hectares of land were eligible for the scheme but with effect from 1 June 2019 all farmers are eligible for the benefits under the scheme. Affluent and high-income farmers are excluded from receiving the benefits of the scheme, these include the pensioners who receive a minimum sum of Rs.10,000 as pension and professionals such as doctors, engineers, lawyers and Chartered Accountants. Recently union agriculture minister Narendra Singh Tomar has awarded the top performing states and UT's under PM-Kisan.

Sub mission on Agroforestry
The Department of Agriculture and Farmers Welfare (DA & FW) has been implementing 
the Sub-Mission on Agroforestry (SMAF) since 2016-17 as part of the recommendation of the National Agroforestry Policy 2014. 
This sub-mission is under the National Mission for Sustainable Agriculture (NMSA), an umbrella scheme under National Action Plan for Climate Change. 
India was the first country to have such a comprehensive policy which was launched at the World 
Agroforestry Congress held in Delhi in February 2014. At present, the scheme is being implemented in 20 States and 2 UTs.

Divisions

 Directorate of Plant Protection, Quarantine, and Storage

References

 
India
1948 establishments in India
Ministries established in 1948
Agricultural organisations based in India